Rowshan Dasht (also known as Rowshan Shahr) is a village in Jey Rural District, in the Central District of Isfahan County, Isfahan Province, Iran. At the 2006 census, its population was 269, in 80 families.

References 

Populated places in Isfahan County